Safiabad (also Romanized as Şafīābād) is a village in Palanganeh Rural District, in the Central District of Javanrud County, Kermanshah Province, Iran. At the 2006 census, its population was 901, in 203 families.

References 

Populated places in Javanrud County